Aracy Balabanian (born February 22, 1940) is a Brazilian actress.

Biography
Balabanian was born in Campo Grande, in the state of Mato Grosso do Sul, Brazil. Her parents were Armenians Raphael and Esther Balabanyans. They emigrated from Ottoman Empire to Brazil, fleeing from the genocide promoted in that country by the Ottoman Turks.

At the age of fifteen, she moved to São Paulo with her parents and helped raise her seven younger brothers. She passed the entrance exam for Social Sciences and for the Escola de Arte Dramática, coming to abandon the studies of Sociology, another entrance exam that she had taken and had been accepted, to devote herself to the theater. She said that she lived in a time when it was considered ugly for a woman to do theater, since women were formerly educated to be housewives and obey their husbands.

Filmography

Television series
 Vila Sésamo (1972-1974).... Gabriela
 Aplauso (1979).... Angélica
 Caso Especial (1993-1994)
 Você Decide (1994)
 Engraçadinha... Seus Amores e Seus Pecados (1995).... Dona Geninha
 Sai de Baixo (1996-2013).... Cassandra Mathias Salão
 Brava Gente (2001)
 Linha Direta Justiça (2003)
 Casos e Acasos (2008).... Amélia
 Queridos Amigos (2008).... Teresa Fernandes Moretti
 Toma Lá, Dá Cá (2008).... Shafika Sarakutian
 Louco por Elas (2012).... Cândida
 Juntos a magia acontece (2019)

Telenovelas
 Marcados Pelo Amor (1964)
 O Amor Tem Cara de Mulher (1966)
 Um Rosto Perdido (1966)
 Angústia de Amar (1967)
 Meu Filho, Minha Vida (1967)
 Sublime Amor (1967)
 Antônio Maria (1968)
 Nino, o Italianinho (1969)
 A Fábrica (1971).... Isabel
 O Primeiro Amor (1972)
 Corrida do Ouro (1974)
 Bravo! (1975)
 O Casarão (1976)
 Locomotivas (1977).... Miena Cabral
 Pecado Rasgado (1978)
 Coração Alado (1980).... Maria Faz-Favor
 Brilhante (1981)
 Elas Por Elas (1982)
 Guerra dos Sexos (1983)
 Transas e Caretas (1984)
 Ti Ti Ti (1985)
 Mania de Querer (1986)
 Helena (1987)
 Que Rei Sou Eu? (1989).... Maria Fromet/Lenore Gaillard
 Rainha da Sucata (1990).... Dona Armênia (Arakel Tchobanian Giovani)
 Felicidade (1991)
 Deus Nos Acuda (1992).... Dona Armênia (Arakel Tchobanian Giovani)
 Pátria Minha (1994)
 A Próxima Vítima (1995).... Filomena Ferreto
 Sabor da Paixão (2002)
 Da Cor do Pecado (2004)
 A Lua Me Disse (2005)
 Eterna Magia (2007)
 Passione (2010).... Gemma Mattoli
 Cheias de Charme (2012)
 Saramandaia (2013).... Dona Pupu (Eponina Camargo)
 Geração Brasil (2014)
 Ligações Perigosas (2016)
 Sol Nascente (2016)
 Pega Pega (2017)
 Malhação: Vidas Brasileiras (2018)

Cinema
 A Primeira Viagem .... Irene (1975)
 Caramujo-Flor .... Woman in black (1998)
 Policarpo Quaresma, Herói do Brasil .... Maricota (1998)

Theatre
 1963 - Os Ossos do Barão
 1966 - Oh, Que Delícia de Guerra
 1968 - Feira Paulista de Opinião
 1969 - Hair
 1977 - Brecht, segundo Brecht
 1980 - À Direita do Presidente
 1985 - Boa Noite, Mãe
 1985 - Time and the Conways
 1988 - Folias no Box
 1991 - Fulaninha e Dona Coisa
 1995 - Noite Feliz
 1998 - Clarice, Coração Selvagem
 2006 - Comendo Entre as Refeições

Awards and nominations

APCA Awards

Best of the Year – Globe Awards

Contigo! Awards

Press Trophy

Quem Awards

References

External links

1940 births
Living people
People from Campo Grande
Brazilian people of Armenian descent
Brazilian telenovela actresses
Brazilian film actresses
Brazilian television actresses
Ethnic Armenian actresses
20th-century Brazilian actresses
21st-century Brazilian actresses